Allaippiddi or Allaipiddy is a village within the Velanai Island in the Jaffna peninsula within Sri Lanka's Northern Province.

Geography
Allaipiddy is strategically located on the causeway from Jaffna towards islets of Velanai and Kayts through Pannai bridge. After Mandaitivu, past the abandoned aluminum factory, lies a large Sri Lanka Navy garrison,  from Allaipiddy.

Demography
Most residents of the village are Sri Lankan Tamils and the majority are Roman Catholics. In May 2006, the population was estimated to be around 800.
At least 150 residents fled the village after the Allaipiddy massacre of May 13, 2006.

Personalities

Vinayakamoorthy, farmer and father, was born in Allaipiddy 
Antonythasan Jesuthasan, author and actor, was born in Allaipiddy.

See also
Allaipiddy massacre
St. Philip Neri Church bombing

References

Villages in Jaffna District
Island South DS Division